Southern leaf-tailed gecko is a common name for several Australian lizards and may refer to:

Phyllurus platurus
Saltuarius swaini

Animal common name disambiguation pages